Michael Kirk is a documentary filmmaker and partial creator of the PBS show Frontline, where he worked as senior producer until 1987. Kirk founded and currently owns the production company, the Kirk Documentary Group, in Brookline, Massachusetts, which has produced dozens of award-winning documentaries, both for Frontline and through his company, that focus on political, social and cultural issues.

Kirk has produced more than 200 national television programs since 1984. He is a former Nieman Fellow in Journalism at Harvard University.

Life and career

Kirk was born in Denver and later moved to Boise, Idaho where he grew up and attended Bishop Kelly High School. He graduated from the University of Idaho in 1971 with a degree in communications. The university named an award after Kirk, "The Michael Kirk Award", given annually to a student in broadcast journalism. Kirk was inducted into the UI Alumni Hall of Fame in 2000 and given an Honorary Degree in 2013.

A key contributor to PBS's Frontline since its inception, Kirk joined Frontline as senior producer for its 1983 national debut on PBS. In 1987, he left Frontline to produce films through his own independent company, the Kirk Documentary Group, located in Brookline, Massachusetts.

Some of his award-winning documentaries include Money, Power and Wall Street (winner of an Emmy Award), League of Denial: The NFL's Concussion Crisis (winner of a Peabody Award and a George Polk Award), United States of Secrets (winner of two Emmy Awards, a WGA Award, a Peabody Award and a duPont-Columbia Award), Gunned Down: The Power of the NRA (winner of an Emmy Award), The Choice 2016 (winner of an Emmy Award), Trump's Takeover and Putin's Revenge (winner of a duPont-Columbia Gold Baton).

He has produced such documentaries as Inside the Meltdown, about the 2008 financial crisis; Bush's War (Winner of an Emmy Award and a WGA Award), about the Iraq War under George W. Bush; and The Way the Music Died, about the dire straits of the record industry.

Kirk has made upwards of 20 films on the Obama and Trump presidencies including The Choice 2020: Trump vs. Biden, Supreme Revenge, Zero Tolerance, Trump's Takeover, Divided States of America, The Choice 2016, United States of Secrets, Putin's Revenge, The Choice 2012, The Warning and many others. In a retrospective on Kirk's body of work, Philip Kennicott described Kirk's documentary style in The Washington Post as "rigorous, even obsessive about getting the chronology straight" and "if newspapers do the rough draft of history, Kirk does a very smooth and fascinating second draft."

In The Los Angeles Times, television critic Robert Lloyd called Kirk's multi-award-winning film United States of Secrets "nuanced" and "compelling", while Variety Sonia Saraiya wrote that his four-hour mini-series Divided States of America "may well be the most important piece of journalism about this tumultuous era of identity politics and populist backlash."

Kirk has produced more than 200 national television programs over the course of his career.

Awards and honors
Recent award-winning documentaries include Kirk's 2019 film Putin's Revenge, which won a Gold Baton from the duPont-Columbia Awards with Frontline, PBS for that year, Trump's Takeover, for which Kirk and Mike Wiser, then won a Writers Guild Award in the Documentary Scripts – Current Events category, and consecutive Emmy wins in 2015, 2016 and 2017 for United States of Secrets, Gunned Down: The Power of the NRA, and The Choice 2016.

In 2013, Kirk won a George Polk Award for League of Denial: The NFL's concussion Crisis and the same award in 2012 for the film, Money, Power and Wall Street. Both films also won two Peabody Awards.

Between 1984 and 2020, Kirk has received over 15 Emmy Awards and 12 Writers Guild of America Awards.

Kirk was inducted into the University of Idaho Alumni Hall of Fame in 2000. He is a former Nieman Fellow in Journalism at Harvard University.

Filmography
Putin and the Presidents (31 January 2023)
Lies, Politics and Democracy (6 September 2022)
Pelosi's Power (22 March 2022)
Putin's Road To War (15 March 2022)
America After 9/11 (7 September 2021)
Trump's American Carnage (26 January 2021)
President Biden (19 January 2021)
United States of Conspiracy (12 January 2021)
The Choice 2020: Trump vs. Biden (22 September 2020)
United States of Conspiracy (28 July 2020)
America's Great Divide (Part 1: 13 January 2020 & Part 2: 14 January 2020)
Zero Tolerance (22 October 2019)
Supreme Revenge (21 May 2019)
The Mueller Investigation (22 March 2019)
Trump's Showdown (2 October 2018)
McCain (17 April 2018)
Trump's Takeover (10 April 2018)
Putin's Revenge (Part 1: 25 October 2017 & Part 2: 1 November 2017)
Bannon's War (23 May 2017)
Trump's Road to the White House (24 January 2017)
Divided States of America Part 1: (17 January 2017 & Part 2: 18 January 2017)
President Trump (3 January 2017)
The Choice 2016 (27 September 2016)
The Secret History of ISIS (17 May 2016)
Netanyahu at War (5 January 2016)
Secrets, Politics and Torture (19 May 2015)
Gunned Down: The Power of the NRA (6 January 2015)
Losing Iraq (29 July 2014)
United States of Secrets (13 May 2014)
League of Denial: The NFL's Concussion Crisis (8 October 2013)
Cliffhanger (12 February 2013)
Inside Obama's Presidency (15 January 2013)
The Choice 2012 (9 October 2012)
Money, Power & Wall Street (Part 1 & 2: 24 April 2012, Part 3 & 4: 1 May 2012)
The Anthrax Files (11 October 2011)
Top Secret America (6 September 2011)
Revolution in Cairo (22 February 2011)
Are We Safer? (18 January 2011)
Obama's Deal (13 April 2010)
The Warning (13 October 2009)
Breaking the Bank (16 June 2009)
Inside the Meltdown (17 February 2009) 
Dreams of Obama (20 January 2009)
The Choice 2008 (14 October 2008)
Caring for Your Parents (2 April 2008)
Bush's War (24 and 25 March 2008)
Cheney's Law (14 October 2007)
Endgame (19 June 2007)
The Lost Year in Iraq (17 October 2006)
The Dark Side (20 June 2006)
The Torture Question (18 October 2005)
Karl Rove the Architect (12 April 2005)
Rumsfeld's War (26 October 2004)
The Way the Music Died (27 May 2004)
From China With Love (15 January 2004)
Cyber Wars! (24 April 2003)  
The Long Road to War (17 March 2003)
The War Behind Closed Doors (20 February 2003)
The Man Who Knew (3 October 2002)
Did Daddy Do It? (25 April 2002)
Battle for the Holy Land (4 April 2002)
Misunderstood Minds (27 March 2002)
American Porn (7 February 2002) 
Gunning For Saddam (November 8, 2001)
Target America (4 October 2001)
LAPD Blues (15 May 2001)
The Clinton Years (January 16, 2001)
The Choice 2000 (2 October 2000)
The War in Europe (22 February 2000)
Killer at Thurston High (18 January 2000)
Give War a Chance (1999)
The Child Terror (1998)
Secrets of an Independent Counsel (1998)
Once Upon a Time in Arkansas (1997)
The Fixers (1997)
The Navy Blues (1996)
The Kevorkian Verdict (1996)
So You Want to Buy A President (1996)
Waco:  The Inside Story (1995) 
Hot Money (1994)
The Kevorkian File (1994)
The Trouble with Baseball (1993)
Clinton Takes Over (1993)
To the Brink of War (1991)
Indian Country (1988)
AIDS: A National Inquiry (1986)
Poison and the Pentagon (1988)
Mount St. Helens: Why They Died (1982)
Boeing vs. the World: The Jet Set (1981)
Do I Look Like I Want to Die? (1979) 
Backstreets (1978)
Some of the Presidents' Men (1978)
 Sweet Land of Liberty: the Moscow Pullman Gay Community (1976)
The Press (1976)
 Teton: Decision and Disaster (1976)
 Kellogg: The Best to You Each Morning (1974)

References

External links

 Michael Kirk, FRONTLINE

American documentary filmmakers
Living people
Nieman Fellows
People from Boise, Idaho
University of Idaho alumni
1947 births